Stefania ayangannae (common name: Ayanganna stefania) is a species of frog in the family Hemiphractidae. It is endemic to Guyana where it is known from Mount Ayanganna (the type locality) and Mount Wokomung, both in the Pacaraima Mountains.

Description
Stefania ayangannae are yellowish-brown or yellowish-red frogs with diagonal paravertebral dark brown marks, often joined to form chevrons in their dorsum. The head has a dark brown patch is present.

Clutch size is 4–9 eggs. Females carry the eggs on their back until they are fully developed and hatch as small froglets; the male and female cooperate to get the eggs on the female's back.

Habitat
Its natural habitat are high-elevation (>1200 m) forests. These frogs can be found at night on leaves or branches 1–5 m above ground.

References

ayangannae
Endemic fauna of Guyana
Amphibians of Guyana
Amphibians described in 2002
Taxa named by Amy Lathrop
Taxa named by Ross Douglas MacCulloch
Taxonomy articles created by Polbot